John Skubal (born September 10, 1946) is an American politician who served in the Kansas Senate from the 11th district from 2017 to 2021. He was defeated in the 2020 Republican primary by state representative Kellie Warren.

References

External links
Vote Smart John Skubal

1946 births
Living people
Republican Party Kansas state senators
21st-century American politicians
Emporia State University alumni